Alberti is a station on Line A of the Buenos Aires Underground. The station belonged to the inaugural section of the Buenos Aires Underground opened on 1 December 1913, which linked the stations Plaza Miserere and Plaza de Mayo. Like the Pasco station, it is one of two stations of the line which only has one platform, in this case only serving passengers heading towards San Pedrito. The other platform (the ghost station Alberti Norte) is located just a few meters away, but was closed in 1953 since the proximity of Pasco station meant having so many stops in such quick succession slowed the line's frequency.

References

External links
http://www.megustaescribir.com/obra/leer/85430/alberti-norte

Buenos Aires Underground stations
Balvanera
Railway stations opened in 1913
1913 establishments in Argentina